Konkanakuratti is a village in Dharwad district of Karnataka, India.

Demographics 
As of the 2011 Census of India there were 265 households in Konkanakuratti and a total population of 1,263 consisting of 637 males and 626 females. There were 142 children ages 0-6.

References

Villages in Dharwad district